Camp Nelson is a census-designated place in Tulare County, California. Camp Nelson has a post office with ZIP code 93208. The population was 97 at the 2010 census. Camp Nelson can be reached from Porterville by 33 curvy miles  on California State Route 190 with an elevation gain of 4,439 feet.

Geography
According to the United States Census Bureau, the CDP covers an area of 1.2 square miles (3.2 km), all of it land.

Climate
This region experiences warm (but not hot) and dry summers, with no average monthly temperatures above 71.6 °F.  According to the Köppen Climate Classification system, Camp Nelson has a warm-summer Mediterranean climate, abbreviated "Csb" on climate maps.

Demographics

At the 2010 census Camp Nelson had a population of 97. The racial makeup of Camp Nelson was 94 (96.9%) White, 0 (0.0%) African American, 0 (0.0%) Native American, 0 (0.0%) Asian, 0 (0.0%) Pacific Islander, 2 (2.1%) from other races, and 1 (1.0%) from two or more races. Hispanic or Latino of any race were 6 people (6.2%).

The whole population lived in households, no one lived in non-institutionalized group quarters and no one was institutionalized.

There were 55 households, 5 (9.1%) had children under the age of 18 living in them, 27 (49.1%) were opposite-sex married couples living together, 1 (1.8%) had a female householder with no husband present, 4 (7.3%) had a male householder with no wife present.  There were 2 (3.6%) unmarried opposite-sex partnerships, and 0 (0%) same-sex married couples or partnerships. 19 households (34.5%) were one person and 8 (14.5%) had someone living alone who was 65 or older. The average household size was 1.76.  There were 32 families (58.2% of households); the average family size was 2.16.

The age distribution was 8 people (8.2%) under the age of 18, 1 people (1.0%) aged 18 to 24, 12 people (12.4%) aged 25 to 44, 40 people (41.2%) aged 45 to 64, and 36 people (37.1%) who were 65 or older.  The median age was 60.2 years. For every 100 females, there were 115.6 males.  For every 100 females age 18 and over, there were 117.1 males.

There were 383 housing units at an average density of 309.2 per square mile, of the occupied units 44 (80.0%) were owner-occupied and 11 (20.0%) were rented. The homeowner vacancy rate was 17.0%; the rental vacancy rate was 25.0%.  79 people (81.4% of the population) lived in owner-occupied housing units and 18 people (18.6%) lived in rental housing units.

Annually, the town hosts the summer Mountain Festival in the Camp Nelson Meadow, which was established through the John M. Nelson conservancy. Apart from the annual festival, visitors come to Camp Nelson to see the grove of Sequoias near Belknap campground. 
A small tungsten mine operated in the area until the 1950s.

History 

In 1886, John Nelson began to homestead land above Porterville that became Nelson’s Camp. This became a popular stopover spot for cattlemen, sheepmen, hunters, and fishermen. Nelson soon enlarged his house and remodeled it into a two-story hotel. Afterwards, a few cabins were added and the spot became known as Nelson’s Camp. John Nelson died August 3, 1909, aged 79. With his death, his daughter, Emma, and her husband took over the operation. In 1922, a road suitable for automobiles was completed to the camp. The camp was sold in 1937 and operated by different families over the years. Electricity reached Camp Nelson in 1951 and in the  mid-1960’s, the road was upgraded to all year access. From 1976 to 1979, the Civil War Re-Enactment Society held Civil War skirmishes in Nelson Meadow with a "Blue and Grey" ball later at the Lodge.

After some complicated financial dealings, the property and business were sold to Jim and Bonnie Hood in June 1987. In a case that attracted national attention,  Bonnie Hood was murdered August 19, 1990 as she slept at the lodge.  Bruce Beauchamp, an employee of Jim Hood, was acquitted of her murder on March 29, 1991.  Jim Hood later shot Beauchamp to death and he was convicted of that murder in a second trial.

Later, Jim Hood deeded the Lodge to his attorney, Philip Bourdette. Ron Peterson, who held the mortgage on the Lodge, foreclosed and won the proceedings. Ron Peterson sold the Lodge to Steven Huth and Mike Quatacker. The Lodge and motel were later sold to Len Aten. Aten held a few conferences and special events in the Lodge, but it was never open to the general public.

The John M Nelson Conservancy (a California non-profit public benefit corporation) was created in 1985 due to the breakup of the Camp Nelson Resort properties. The primary aim of the Conservancy was to acquire the six and a half acre Camp Nelson meadow. After raising $85,000 in public donations, the Conservancy  acquired the meadow in December, 1997.  Special events are held in the meadow from time to time.

In September, 2020, Camp Nelson was spared the destruction of other small communities in the area by the naturally sparked Sequoia Complex Fire (SQF Complex)

References

Census-designated places in Tulare County, California
Census-designated places in California